Robert R. Spitzer (4 May 1922 – 30 April 2019) was an American agricultural researcher who worked with Murphy Products Co. for 28 years and was the third president of Milwaukee School of Engineering.

Spitzer was born on 4 May 1922 in Waukesha, Wisconsin. He died on 30 April 2019 in Burlington, Wisconsin.

References

 

People from Waukesha, Wisconsin
2019 deaths
1922 births
Milwaukee School of Engineering people
American agronomists
Scientists from Wisconsin
Academics from Wisconsin
University of Wisconsin–Madison alumni